Grills is the plural of grill.

As a surname, Grills may refer to:
Caroline Grills (1890–1960), Australian serial killer
Dave Grills (born 1959), Australian politician
Lee Grills (1904–1982), Canadian politician
Leo Grills, known as Lucky Grills (1928–2007), Australian actor and comedian

See also
 Grylls, a surname
 Grillz, a 2005 song
 Grill (jewelry)